The St. Nicholas Chapel is a historic Russian Orthodox church in the native village of Igiugig, Alaska, United States. Now it is under Diocese of Alaska of the Orthodox Church in America

The long walls each have three sash windows. A detached bell tower, holding five bells, stands next to the church. The church was built in 1930. The vestibule has seen the addition of a little onion dome sometime after 1990.

The church was listed on the National Register of Historic Places in 1980.

See also
National Register of Historic Places listings in Lake and Peninsula Borough, Alaska

References

Buildings and structures in Lake and Peninsula Borough, Alaska
Churches completed in 1930
Churches on the National Register of Historic Places in Alaska
Russian Orthodox church buildings in Alaska
Buildings and structures on the National Register of Historic Places in Lake and Peninsula Borough, Alaska